Antigua and Barbuda first competed at the Olympic Games in 1976, and has participated in each subsequent Summer Olympics with the exception of the 1980 Moscow Olympics (Games of the XXII Olympiad); Antigua and Barbuda participated in the American-led boycott.

The nation has never won a medal at the Summer Olympics.  Antigua and Barbuda has never competed in the Winter Olympics (also known as the Olympic Winter Games).

The Antigua and Barbuda Olympic Association was formed in 1966 after the dissolution of the West Indies Federation in 1962, and recognized in 1976.

Medal tables

Medals by Summer Games

Flagbearers

See also
Antigua and Barbuda at the Paralympics
Antigua and Barbuda at the Commonwealth Games

External links